Shortridge's mouse (Mus shortridgei) is a species of rodent in the family Muridae.
It is found in Cambodia, Laos, Myanmar, Thailand, and Vietnam.

References

Mus (rodent)
Mammals described in 1914
Taxa named by Oldfield Thomas
Taxonomy articles created by Polbot